Just Like That... is the eighteenth studio album by American singer, songwriter, and guitarist Bonnie Raitt. Released on April 22, 2022, it is her first studio album since 2016's Dig In Deep. The album was nominated for a Grammy award for Best Americana Album in 2023.  Its title track won the Grammy Award for Song of the Year and Best American Roots Song and lead single "Made Up Mind" won Best Americana Performance.

Background
The album, recorded and mixed by Ryan Freeland, is her third for her own Redwing Records. It is her 11th recording with her longtime drummer Ricky Fataar  and 12th with longtime bassist James "Hutch" Hutchinson. "Made Up Mind" was released as a single on February 25, 2022, reaching number 17 on the US Billboard Adult album alternative (AAA) chart. "Made Up Mind" was followed by the singles "Something's Got a Hold of My Heart" and "Livin' for the Ones" prior to the album's release.

Release and reception
Upon its release, Just Like That... made it to number one on six Billboard charts, and number 44 on the Billboard 200.

On AllMusic, Stephen Thomas Erlewine wrote, "The blend of rock, blues, soul, reggae, folk, and pop that fuels Just Like That – her 18th album and first since 2016's Dig In Deep – is deeply familiar, evoking memories of her classic 1970s LPs while sounding of a piece with such relaxed latter-day records as Slipstream... It all adds up to an album that slowly works its way into the subconscious, sounding deeper and richer with each successive play."

Track listing

Personnel 
 Bonnie Raitt – vocals, electric slide guitar (1, 2, 3, 5, 7, 8), acoustic guitar (4, 10), arrangements (8, 9), electric guitar (9)
 Glenn Patscha – Rhodes piano (1, 2, 5, 6), Hammond B3 organ (1, 4, 6, 7, 8, 10), backing vocals (1, 2, 3, 5, 8), acoustic piano (3, 8), electric piano (3), clavinet (3, 8), Wurlitzer electric piano (8)
 Jon Cleary – electric piano (9), percussion (9), backing vocals (9)
 Mike Finnigan – Hammond B3 organ (9), backing vocals (9)
 Kenny Greenberg – electric guitar (1-8), acoustic guitar (8)
 George Marinelli – electric guitar (3, 9), backing vocals (3), percussion (9)
 James "Hutch" Hutchinson – bass (1-9)
 Ricky Fataar – drums (1-9), percussion (1-9), backing vocals (1, 2, 3, 8, 9)

Production 
 Bonnie Raitt – producer, styling, staging, liner notes 
 Ryan Freeland – recording, mixing 
 Derek Williams – second engineer (1-8, 10)
 Pablo Hernandez – second engineer (9)
 Josh Simmons – third engineer (9)
 Jeff Jaffe – vocal session overdubs
 Matt Reagen – assistant engineer (1-8, 10), overdub assistant 
 Kim Rosen – mastering at Knack Mastering (Ringwood, New Jersey)
 Ray Fernandez – label coordinator
 Brian Porizek – art direction, design 
 Molly Bosted – photo whisperer
 Ken Friedman – photography 
 Tim Konrad – performance photography
 Ed Rode – performance photography
 Kathy Kane – management 
 Annie Heller-Gutwillig – management

Crew
 Derek Williams – pre/post recording, production manager 
 McKenzee Morley – reshersal monitor engineer 
 Ross Lahey – technician (keyboards, guitars, bass)

Charts

References

2022 albums
Bonnie Raitt albums